The 2015 USAC Honda National Midget Series is the 60th season of the USAC National Midget Series. The series began with the Kokomo Grand Prix at Kokomo Speedway on April 10, and will end with the Turkey Night Grand Prix at Perris Auto Speedway on November 26. Rico Abreu will be the defending champion.

Schedule notes 

 - The June 21 race at Kokomo Speedway was originally scheduled for June 14 but was postponed due to inclement weather. The race was canceled after inclement weather hit the area on that night as well
 - The July 5 race at Angell Park Speedway was co-sanctioned with the POWRi Lucas Oil National Midget Series & Badger Midgets 
 - The Eastern Storm races at Path Valley Speedway Park, Lincoln Speedway, and Susquehanna Speedway Park were co-sanctioned with the ARDC.
 - The October 23 race at Wayne County Speedway will be co-sanctioned with the POWRi Lucas Oil National Midget Series
 - The Turkey Night Grand Prix at Perris Auto Speedway will be a combined series race with the USAC Honda Western States Midgets

References

USAC National Midget Series
United States Auto Club